Japchae is a savory and slightly sweet dish of stir-fried glass noodles and vegetables that is popular in Korean cuisine. Japchae is typically prepared with dangmyeon (당면, 唐麵), a type of cellophane noodles made from sweet potato starch; the noodles are mixed with assorted vegetables, meat, and mushrooms, and seasoned with soy sauce and sesame oil.

Once a royal dish, japchae is now one of the most popular traditional celebration dishes, often served on special occasions, such as weddings, birthdays (especially dol, the first birthday, and hwangap, the sixtieth), and holidays. It is also popular at banquets, parties, and potlucks, due to the ease of bulk preparation and flexible serving: japchae can be served warm, at room temperature, or cold from the refrigerator, and can be eaten freshly made or the day after.

Japchae is commonly served as a banchan (side dish), though it may also be eaten as a main dish. It is sometimes served on a bed of rice: with rice, it is known as japchae-bap.

Etymology and history 
The Sino-Korean word japchae consists of two syllables, jap meaning "mixed" and chae meaning "vegetable".  

According to Veritable Records of the Joseon Dynasty, the name originally referred to a stir-fried vegetable and mushroom dish, first made in the early 17th century by Yi Chung (1568‒1619) for King Gwanghaegun's palace banquet. The king liked the dish so much that he rewarded Yi by promoting him to a high-ranking position, equivalent to the position of Secretary of the Treasury, and japchae became a fixture of Korean royal court cuisine. Cooked without noodles or meat at the time, japchae was considered a luxurious and elegant dish served to the royal family and high-level officials. Cucumbers, radishes, and shiitake mushrooms were among the vegetables used in this period.

Japchae, like other royal dishes, was eventually adopted into the cuisine of common people. Its popularity increased later in the 20th century when cellophane noodles made from sweet potato starch were introduced to Korea from China. The noodles have since become an integral and primary ingredient of japchae. Beef and other meats have been added to the noodle dish, while experimentation and adaptations have led to many noodle-less variations made with seafood, herbs, peppers, bean sprouts, and other ingredients.

Ingredients and preparation 

Dangmyeon are pale grey, semi-transparent, chewy and elastic noodles made from sweet potato starch. They are also known as "glass noodles", "cellophane noodles", or "sweet potato vermicelli". The noodles may be soaked in water before cooking. Noodles are sometimes soaked in hot water and then stir-fried. The assortment of vegetables in japchae may vary, with typical ingredients including mushrooms, carrots, spinach, onions, egg and scallions. Commonly used mushrooms are wood ear, shiitake, and oyster mushrooms. Both beef and pork are commonly used for japchae. Each ingredient is stir-fried separately before being mixed with boiled and drained noodles, and seasoned with soy sauce, sugar, chopped garlic and sesame oil. The dish is usually garnished with toasted sesame seeds and chili threads, and served hot or cold.

Varieties

Royal court dishes 
 Gyeoja-chae
 Jokchae – made with shredded jokpyeon (trotter jelly) and vegetables
 Tangpyeong-chae – made with nokdu-muk (mung bean jelly), beef, mung bean sprouts, water dropwort, and mugwort
 Wolgwa-chae – made with Oriental pickling melon, beef, and vegetables
 Juksoon-chae - made with bamboo shoots and vegetables

Other dishes 
 Gochu-japchae – made with shredded green pepper and vegetables
 Buchu-japchae – made with garlic chives
 Kongnamul-japchae – made with soybean sprouts
 Haemul-japchae – made with seafood and vegetables
 Beoseot-japchae – made with mushrooms
 Gungjung-japchae - made with high-grade ingredients and royal vegetables

See also 

 Gochu-japchae
 Tangpyeong-chae
 Wolgwa-chae
 List of sweet potato dishes

References 

Korean noodle dishes
Mixed noodles